The Honda GB500 'Tourist Trophy' (or TT) is an air-cooled single-cylinder solo café racer motorcycle. It was first marketed in Japan in 1985 in two 400 cc and one 500 cc versions. In 1989, Honda introduced a third 400 cc version for Japan; and in 1989 and 1990 a 500 cc version was available in the United States. 

The GB500 TT's design, mechanical configuration and café racer styling recall British 500 cc singles of the 1950s,  such as the BSA Gold Star and Velocette Venom. The GB500 TT derives its name from "Great Britain and from the Tourist Trophy (or TT),  a classic 37-mile road circuit on the Isle of Man.

Overview
The GB500's engine was derived from the Honda XL600 engine, a dry-sump four-stroke dirt bike. The four-valve single cylinder engine featured a radial four-valve combustion chamber, along with a tubular frame, wire-spoked wheels with alloy rims, clip-on handlebars, solo seat, seat hump, and pin-striped fuel tank. The styling resembled TT single-cylinder racing bikes (such as the Manx Norton, the BSA Gold Star and the AJS 7R) that were prominent in the TT until the 1960s. When introduced, sales were sluggish and the model did not sell well in export markets. However, today GB500s in good condition command premium prices.

Japanese and non-US export models had the tank and side panels painted in dark maroon with a Honda wing decal on the tank. It was available with either a single seat with no cowl or a dual seat, the latter version having a longer footrest carrier on the left to carry a pillion footrest. It featured clip-on handlebars and the instruments featured a black background with white lettering. US-model production was for model years 1989 and 1990 and featured black-green paint with gold pin-striping and lettering, as well as chrome wire wheels. Like the Japan-market model, it had steel-braided oil lines, steel side covers (i.e., not plastic), fork gaiters, non-adjustable fork with hydraulic damping and 18-inch wheels with tube-type tires. However, its round gauges have matte silver faces and its solo seat has a painted rear cowling.

In 1992, a third party exported 1,000 unsold Honda GB 500s from the United States to Germany (where the model is known as the "Clubman") as grey import vehicles.

Both the 400 cc and 500 cc versions were imported and sold by Honda, New Zealand. When originally released in NZ, the GB came in three models: dual seat; Mk2 with half-fairing, single seat with cowling; and no fairing, single seat.

References

GB500
Sport bikes
Motorcycles introduced in 1989